Derek Bolton White (born 30 January 1958) is a former Scotland international rugby union player. His regular playing position are Flanker and Number 8.

Early life

White was born on 30 January 1958 in Haddington, Scotland.  He was educated at Dunbar Grammar School.

Rugby Union career

Amateur career

During his playing career he was 6 ft 4 and 1/2 inches tall. He was once described as "a big bulky back-row with pace and a mean streak".

White played rugby for Dunbar, before moving to Haddington, and then Gala.

White moved to Petersfield, Hampshire, where he played for London Scottish until the mid-1990s. He then played for Petersfield.

Provincial career

White played for South of Scotland District.

International career

White played at Flanker for Scotland 'B' against Ireland 'B' on 7 February 1982.

White had 42 caps for Scotland, from 1982 to 1992, scoring 11 tries, 44 points on aggregate. He played at the 1987 Rugby World Cup and at the 1991 Rugby World Cup as well as being part of the squad that won the Grand Slam in the 1990 Five Nations Championship.

White was on the British & Irish Lions 1989 tour of Australia. White moved to Petersfield, Hampshire, where he played for London Scottish until the mid-1990s.

Coaching career

White was a player-coach at Petersfield.

References

External links
 profile at ESPN

1958 births
Living people
Scottish rugby union players
Scotland international rugby union players
British & Irish Lions rugby union players from Scotland
Rugby union number eights
Gala RFC players
London Scottish F.C. players
Haddington RFC players
Dunbar RFC players
Scotland 'B' international rugby union players
South of Scotland District (rugby union) players
Rugby union players from East Lothian